Maudet is a surname. Notable people with the surname include:

 Damien Maudet (born 1996), French politician
 Pierre Maudet (born 1978), Swiss and French politician

See also
 Maudétour-en-Vexin

Surnames of French origin